Christmaplacidae is a family of crab in the superfamily Pseudozioidea containing the species Christmaplax mirabilis from Christmas Island, Australia, and Harryplax severus from Guam.

References

Crabs
Decapod families